Njegoš Sikiraš (born April 11, 1999) is а Bosnian professional basketball player for Borac Banja Luka of the Championship of Bosnia and Herzegovina and the Second ABA League. Standing at 6 ft 9.1 in (2.06 m) and weighing 210 lb (95 kg), Sikiraš plays the power forward position.

Early career
Njegoš was born in Pale. He started playing basketball at his local club Tri Poena when he was 12 years old, at the advice of his sister. After playing for KK Budućnost Bijeljina he moved to A.S. Stella Azzurra in August 2013. After a move to Alba Berlin due to disagreement between the clubs about the transfer fee he signed 5-year contract with Baloncesto Fuenlabrada in March 2017.

In August 2021, Njegoš signed for Borac Banja Luka.

Awards and accomplishments

Bosnian national team
2015 FIBA Europe Under-16 Championship:

Individual
2015 FIBA Europe U-16 Championship All-Tournament Team

References

External links 
ACB.com Profile
Profile at eurobasket.com

1999 births
Living people
Baloncesto Fuenlabrada players
Bosnia and Herzegovina expatriate basketball people in Spain
Bosnia and Herzegovina men's basketball players
Club Melilla Baloncesto players
A.S. Stella Azzurra players
Naturalised citizens of Spain
Liga ACB players
Power forwards (basketball)
Serbs of Bosnia and Herzegovina
Spanish men's basketball players
Spanish expatriate basketball people in Italy
Spanish people of Bosnia and Herzegovina descent
Spanish people of Serbian descent